= Purolator 500 =

Purolator 500 may refer to two different NASCAR races:

- Purolator 500 (Pocono), the race at Pocono Raceway from 1974 to 1976 (now Gander Outdoors 400)
- Purolator 500 (Atlanta), the race at Atlanta Motor Speedway from 1994 to 1996 (now Kobalt Tools 500)
